Matt Mitchell may refer to:

Sports
Matt Mitchell (American football), American football coach and former player
Matt Mitchell (basketball) (born 1999), American basketball player
Matthew Mitchell (basketball) (born 1970), American basketball coach
Matt Mitchell (tennis) (born 1957), American tennis player

Others
Matt Mitchell (pianist) (born 1975), American jazz pianist and composer
Matthew Mitchell (artist), American artist